Target may refer to:

Physical items
 Shooting target, used in marksmanship training and various shooting sports
 Bullseye (target), the goal one for which one aims in many of these sports
 Aiming point, in field artillery, fixed at a specific target
 Color chart (or reference card), the reference target used in digital imaging for accurate color reproduction

Places
 Target, Allier, France
 Target Lake, a lake in Minnesota

Terms
 Target market, marketing strategy
 Target audience, intended audience or readership of a publication, advertisement, or type of message
 In mathematics, the target of a function is also called the codomain
 Target (cricket), the total number of runs a team needs to win

People
 Target (rapper), stage name of Croatian hip-hop artist Nenad Šimun
 DJ Target, stage name of English grime DJ Darren Joseph, member of Roll Deep
 Gui-Jean-Baptiste Target (1733–1807), French lawyer

Art and media
 The Target, a comic book character, one of the trio Target and the Targeteers

Film
 Target (1952 film), a Western starring Tim Holt
 Target (1979 film), a crime film starring Luc Merenda 
 Target (1985 film), a thriller starring Gene Hackman
 Target (1995 film), a drama directed by Sandip Ray
 Target (2004 film), an action film starring Stephen Baldwin
 Target (2010 film), a Bengali-language Indian film
 Target (2011 film), a Russian drama directed by Alexander Zeldovich
 Target (2014 film), an action suspense crime film directed by Yang Jiang 
 The Target (film), a 2014 action film starring Ryu Seung-ryong

Games and sport
 Target (video game), a  microcomputer game 
 Target (word puzzle)
 Target Center, an indoor sports arena
 Target Field, a baseball park

Music
 Target (band), South Korean band
 Target (American band), American band from the 1970s
 "Target" (Embrace song), 2006
 "Target" (T-ara song), 2013
 The Target (EP), a 2002 EP by Hoobastank
 Target (album), an album by Gerald Walker

Publications
 Target (journal), an academic journal of translation studies
 Target (magazine), an Indian children's magazine
 Target: 2006, a Transformers comic book story arc
 The Target (novel), a 2014 novel by David Baldacci
 Target, the magazine of the British Productivity Council
 Target, an Lao news magazine

Television

Series
 Target (American TV series), a short-lived American 1958 syndicated anthology television series
 Target (New Zealand TV series), a consumer affairs program
 Target (British TV series), a 1970s British police drama

Episodes
 "The Target" (The Office)
 "The Target" (The Wire)
 "The Target", the second episode of the first season of Dollhouse

Brands, enterprises, and organizations
 Aeros Target, hang glider
 Target Apparel, a former Canadian clothing brand unrelated to any of the below
 Target Australia, an Australian retail chain similar to, but not associated with, Target Corporation
 Target Books, a publishing imprint
 Target Corporation, an American retail chain
 Target Canada, its defunct Canadian subsidiary
 TARGET (NGO), a human rights organization founded by Rüdiger Nehberg
 Target Video, a San Francisco-based video and film studio
 TechTarget, an American company

Computing and technology
 A debugger term referring to the subject of testing or debugging
 TARGET2, a Eurozone interbank payment system which succeeded TARGET
 TARGET 3001!, a computer-aided design (CAD) program
 The file that a symbolic link refers to
 Target (project), a collaborative research project in the Netherlands

See also
 Human Target (disambiguation)
 Targeteer (disambiguation)
 Targeting (disambiguation)